Anthony Michael Manton Elliott CBE (7 January 1947 – 16 July 2020) was an English publisher, the founder and owner of Time Out Group, based in London. He was educated at Stowe School and Keele University.

Life
Formerly married to Janet Street-Porter, he later married Jane Coke, with whom he had three sons. Elliott was appointed Commander of the Order of the British Empire (CBE) in the 2017 Birthday Honours for services to publishing.

Elliott died in London of lung cancer on 16 July 2020, at the age of 73.

References

External links
 Tony Elliott, late founder of Time Out
 Time Out founder Tony Elliott dies - tributes from "friends, colleagues and cultural luminaries"

1947 births
2020 deaths
Alumni of Keele University
British magazine publishers (people)
People educated at Stowe School
Commanders of the Order of the British Empire
People from Reading, Berkshire